Alex Hoberg (born 27 November 2001) is an Australian sport shooter. In 2017, he won the gold medal in the men's 10 meter air rifle event at the 2017 Commonwealth Shooting Championships held in Brisbane, Australia.

In 2018, he represented Australia at the 2018 Commonwealth Games held in Gold Coast, Australia and he finished in 4th place in the men's 10 metre air rifle event. In the same year, he also represented Australia at the 2018 Summer Youth Olympics held in Buenos Aires, Argentina. In 2019, he won three gold medals, two silver medals and one bronze medal at the 2019 Oceania Shooting Championships held in Sydney, Australia.

Hoberg represented Australia at the 2020 Summer Olympics in Tokyo, Japan. He competed in the men's 10 metre air rifle and mixed 10 metre air rifle team events. He did not score sufficient points in either event to advance past qualification. Detailed results can be found in Australia at the 2020 Summer Olympics.

References

External links
 

Living people
2001 births
Place of birth missing (living people)
Australian male sport shooters
Shooters at the 2018 Commonwealth Games
Shooters at the 2018 Summer Youth Olympics
Commonwealth Games competitors for Australia
Shooters at the 2020 Summer Olympics
Olympic shooters of Australia
21st-century Australian people